The 8th FINA World Swimming Championships (25 m) swam April 5–9, 2006 at the Qizhong Forest Sports City Arena in Shanghai, China.

Participating nations
A total of 116 nations had entered swimmers at the 2006 Short Course Worlds.

Results

Men

Women

Medal table

References

 Event website: www.fina-shanghai2006.com 
 Copy of results from swimrankings.net

FINA World Swimming Championships (25 m)
FINA Short Course World Championships
S
2006 World Short Course Championships
S
April 2006 sports events in Asia
2000s in Shanghai
Swimming in Shanghai